The Afeka College of Engineering (Afeka Tel Aviv Academic College of Engineering) is a public college in Tel Aviv, Israel. Afeka was established in 1996 and grants Bachelor and Masters degrees in engineering. The college offers 5 undergraduate programs with 17 fields of specialization as well as 5 graduate programs.

Afeka combines engineering programs with an emphasis on entrepreneurship. Programs at Afeka include electrical and electronic engineering; mechanical engineering; software engineering; industrial engineering and management; medical engineering, systems engineering, energy engineering, and engineering and management of service systems Master of Science programmes.

See also
List of Israeli universities and colleges
Education in Israel
Science and technology in Israel

References

External links
Afeka College of Engineering

Colleges in Israel
Universities and colleges in Tel Aviv
Educational institutions established in 1996
1996 establishments in Israel